Harrisville Pond is a  water body located in Cheshire County in southwestern New Hampshire, United States, in the town of Harrisville. It is one of many lakes and ponds along Nubanusit Brook, a tributary of the Contoocook River. Water from Nubanusit Lake flows via the Great Meadows into the pond on the north side and out of the pond at two dams on the south side. One dam allows the level of the pond to be raised or lowered and also adjusts the flow through the mills that span that part of the outlet, while the other dam is made of large stones and sandbags. The village of Harrisville is located at the outlet of the pond.

The pond is warm water and contains largemouth and smallmouth bass, Eastern chain pickerel, brown bullhead, black crappie and bluegill.

See also

List of lakes in New Hampshire

References

Lakes of Cheshire County, New Hampshire
Harrisville, New Hampshire